Uyarangalil is a 1984 Indian Malayalam-language thriller film directed by I. V. Sasi and written by M. T. Vasudevan Nair. It stars Mohanlal, Nedumudi Venu, Rahman, Ratheesh, Kajal Kiran and Swapna, . The music for the film was provided by Shyam. The film was a commercial success at the box office. It is regarded as one of the best thrillers in Malayalam cinema and developed a cult following. Mohanlal plays an anti-hero role, critics cite the film to have one of the best performances of Mohanlal.

Plot
Jayarajan, an over-enthusiastic assistant manager at a tea plantation plans to loot a huge amount from the company. He lures two debt-ridden subordinates, Chandran and Joseph, into his conspiracy. Though unwilling, both agree. But during their attempt, A. K. Menon, the manager of the company catches them red-handed. To keep matters under wraps, Jayarajan enters Menon's house at night asking Joseph and Chandran to wait outside saying that he would negotiate with Menon. Jayarajan kills Menon and escapes from the house. He acts normal the next day and provides help to the police. But both Joseph and Chandran feel guilty to the soul. Jayarajan says he will keep silent and act as if nothing happened.

Soon, however, Jayarajan is elevated as the new Manager of the company. Devi, the fed-up young widow of Menon, due to Menon's negligent behaviour towards her, arrives at the plantation for terminal financial formalities. Jayarajan, who already was having an affair with Padma (a nurse of the Plantation Hospital who is money-oriented and having a loose morality in relations with men) now eyes Devi. He succeeds in seducing her and having sex with her after which he plans to siphon off all the financial benefits that she might get as Menon's bereavement benefits. But a cop, Ravi, becomes suspicious of Jayarajan, although he has nothing to nail on Jayarajan, due to the flawless and naturally responsive demeanour of Jayarajan.

Cop Ravi starts investigating Jayarajan's past and finds some loose ends, but he gets no solid proof in this regard. But Ravi keeps a watch on Jayarajan. However, Jayarajan neither stops his illicit relationship with Padma the nurse nor deserts Devi. In a strange turn of events, fearing faint-hearted Joseph might spill the beans of the Manager's murder, Jayarajan finishes off Joseph in an orchestrated jeep accident and Padma, by strangulation, mimicking a suicide without any trace of suspicion about the two murders to anybody except Chandran, whose silence Jayarajan buys with scare tactics.

Meanwhile, the elderly owner of the estate visits the plantation. Knowing that his young daughter Vasanthi would inherit the company, Jayarajan tries to woo her too. But Devi becomes a hindrance in his plans and her insistence for a marriage pushes him to plot a plan to finish off Devi too. But before he can kill Devi, Chandran informs Vasanthi the truth about the death of Menon and both succeed in calling the cops. But before getting arrested by Ravi, Jayarajan jumps down from the heights and commits suicide.

Cast

Mohanlal as P. K. Jayarajan
Rahman as Chandran 
Nedumudi Venu as Joseph (Driver)
Ratheesh as Sub Inspector Ravi 
Kajal Kiran as Devi Menon
Swapna as Padhma 
Viji as Vasanthi
Thilakan as Circle Inspector Kurup 
Jagathy Sreekumar as Pillai (Office Manager)
K. P. Ummer as Santhosh Varma, Owner of Plantation 
Bahadoor as Constable Sankaran Nair 
Janardhanan as A. K. Menon
Adoor Bhavani as Betsy, Joseph's mother 
Balan K. Nair as Superintendent of Police Swaminathan (Cameo)
Kunchan as Compounter Karunan
Azeez as Dinesh, A. K. Menon's brother. 
P. K. Abraham
T. P. Madhavan as Dr. Varghese
Prathapachandran as Fr. Stephen Chacko
Meghanathan as Gopi, Chandran's brother
Sathyakala
 Roshni as Nancy, Joseph's Sister
 Sulekha

Soundtrack
The music was composed by Shyam and the lyrics were written by Bichu Thirumala.

Release
Released on 30 November 1984, the film was a commercial success at the box office. The film is also noted for having one of Mohanlal's finest performances in his early career. It is regarded as one of the best thrillers in Malayalam cinema and has a cult following.

References

External links

Uyarangalil on Malayala Chalachithram
Uyarangalil on Malayala Sangeetham

1980s Malayalam-language films
1984 films
Indian thriller films
Films shot in Munnar
Films with screenplays by M. T. Vasudevan Nair
Films directed by I. V. Sasi